This article lists the winners and nominees for the NAACP Image Award for Outstanding Literary Work – Nonfiction. Maya Angelou, Michael Eric Dyson, and Barack Obama hold the record for most wins in this category, with two each.

Winners and nominees
Winners are listed first and highlighted in bold.

1990s

2000s

2010s

2020s

Multiple wins and nominations

Wins
 2 wins
 Maya Angelou
 Michael Eric Dyson
 Barack Obama

Nominations

 5 nominations
 Michael Eric Dyson

 3 nominations
 Maya Angelou

 2 nominations
 Henry Louis Gates Jr.
 Hill Harper
 Barack Obama
 Gil L. Robertson
 Tavis Smiley
 Imani Perry

References

NAACP Image Awards
American literary awards